The 2015 Winmau World Masters was a major tournament on the BDO/WDF calendar for 2015. It took place from 8–11 October at the Hull City Hall, which hosted the stage element of the event for the fourth year.

Men's Seeds
The seedings were finalised on 31 August. For the fourth consecutive year, there are 32 seeds (an increase from 8 between 2007–2011) with the Top 16 exempt until the Last 32 stage.

Men's Draw
Last 32 onwards.
Sets are best of 3 legs.

Last 32

Women's seeds
The seedings were finalised on 31 August. The women's seeds enter at the start of the competition.

Women's draw
Last 8 onwards.

Boys Final

Girls Final

References

World Masters (darts)
World Masters
World Masters
Sport in Kingston upon Hull
2010s in Kingston upon Hull